ChalkZone is an American animated television series that aired on Nickelodeon. The show premiered on March 22, 2002, and finished airing its fourth and final season on August 23, 2008. Before becoming a full-fledged series, eight segments aired on the network's Oh Yeah! Cartoons program during 1998 and 1999.

Series overview

Episodes

Season 1 (2002)
Note: This season was originally produced in 1999 but wasn't aired by Nickelodeon for executive reasons until 2002.

Season 2 (2003)

Season 3 (2004–05)

Season 4 (2005–08)
Note: Frederator Studios announced shortly before this season premiered that the series had been cancelled. Nickelodeon began to air the Season 4 episodes in June 2005 before abruptly halting the broadcast of new episodes for 3 years until June 2008 when the final episodes aired, with the final episode airing in August.

References

External links

 ChalkZone at Frederator Studios
 
 

Lists of American children's animated television series episodes
Lists of Nickelodeon television series episodes